The ACP–EU Joint Parliamentary Assembly was created to bring together the elected representatives of the European Union (the Members of the European Parliament) and the elected representatives of the African, Caribbean and Pacific states ("ACP countries") that have signed the Cotonou Agreement.

Since the entry into force of the Treaty on European Union and EU enlargement it has acquired a more prominent role. A substantial part of the work of the JPA is directed towards promoting human rights and democracy and the common values of humanity, and this has produced joint commitments undertaken within the framework of the UN conferences.

The Cotonou agreement 

The following articles of the Cotonou Agreement relate to the Joint Parliamentary Assembly.

Article 14: The joint institutions
The institutions of this Agreement are the Council of Ministers, the Committee of Ambassadors and the Joint Parliamentary Assembly.

Article 17: The Joint Parliamentary Assembly
1. The Joint Parliamentary Assembly shall be composed of equal numbers of EU and ACP representatives. The members of the Joint Parliamentary Assembly shall be, on the one hand, members of the European Parliament and, on the other, members of parliament or, failing this, representatives designated by the parliament of each ACP State. In the absence of a parliament, the attendance of a representative from the ACP State concerned shall be subject to the prior approval of the Joint Parliamentary Assembly. 

2. The role of the Joint Parliamentary Assembly, as a consultative body, shall be to:

promote democratic processes through dialogue and consultation; 
facilitate greater understanding between the peoples of the European Union and those of the ACP :States and raise public awareness of development issues; 
discuss issues pertaining to development and the ACP-EU Partnership;
adopt resolutions and make recommendations to the Council of Ministers with a view to achieving the objectives of this Agreement.
 
3. The Joint Parliamentary Assembly shall meet twice a year in plenary session, alternately in the European Union and in an ACP State. With a view to strengthening regional integration and fostering cooperation between national parliaments, meetings between EU and ACP members of parliament may be arranged at regional or subregional level.

The Joint Parliamentary Assembly shall organise regular contacts with representatives of the ACP-EU economic and social partners and the other actors of civil society in order to obtain their views on the attainment of the objectives of this Agreement. 

4. The Joint Parliamentary Assembly shall adopt its rules of procedure within six months of the entry into force of this Agreement.

Composition and working methods

The representatives of the 78 ACP states who, under the Cotonou Agreement, must be members of Parliament, meet their 78 European Parliament counterparts in plenary session for one week twice a year. The Joint Parliamentary Assembly (JPA) meets alternately in an ACP country and an EU country. The institution is governed by common, democratic rules.

Two co-presidents who are elected by the Assembly direct its work. Twenty-four vice-presidents (12 European and 12 ACP) who are also elected by the Assembly constitute the Bureau of the Joint Parliamentary Assembly, together with the two co-presidents. The Bureau meets several times a year in order to ensure the continuity of the work of the Joint Parliamentary Assembly and to prepare new initiatives aimed notably at reinforcing and improving cooperation. It also considers topical political questions and adopts positions on all human rights cases.

Three Standing Committees have been created in 2003 to draw up substantive proposals which are then voted on by the Joint Parliamentary Assembly. These Committees are:

 Committee on Political Affairs
 Committee on Economic Development, Finance and Trade
 Committee on Social Affairs and the Environment

The Assembly regularly forms exploratory or fact-finding missions. The members of the Joint Parliamentary Assembly are thus in direct contact with the situation on the ground in the various developing countries which are signatories of the Cotonou Agreement.

Initiatives taken by the Joint Parliamentary Assembly

The Joint Parliamentary Assembly has made an active contribution towards implementing and reinforcing successive ACP-EU Conventions and has put forward numerous proposals:

 the upgrading of the role of women in the development process;
 the integration of environment policy in development projects;
 promotion of Trade as a tool for development, particularly by way of the Economic Partnership Agreements foreseen in the Cotonou Agreement;
 the drawing-up of rural development programmes and micro-projects tailored to the needs of specific communities;
 the improvement of measures aimed at combating epidemics and the reinforcement of health and hygiene services;
 the creation of decentralized development policies;
 the convening of annual meetings between economic and social partners;
 the promotion of regional, political and commercial cooperation;
 closer cooperation with non-governmental organisations engaged in development;
 aid for indebted countries pursuing structural adjustment policies to allow them to maintain indispensable services;
 measures to enhance the cultural dimension in North-South cooperation;
 the acceleration of aid procedures and the increase in appropriations intended for refugees and for displaced persons (the latter is a new departure);
 measures to reinforce the commitment to respect and defend human rights and human dignity.

The Co-Presidents

EU co-president:  Carlos Zorrinho, Portugal
ACP co-president: Peter Kenilorea Jr., Solomon Islands

EU members of the assembly

The EU members are all members of the European Parliament.
EU Members of the ACP EU JPA From www.europarl.europa.eu

Meetings of the Joint Parliamentary Assembly
 40th Session, Brussels/ remote and reduced due to COVID-19 pandemic, 17 and 24 June 2021 
 39th Session, Brussels/ remote and reduced due to COVID-19 pandemic, 3 and 10 December 2020 
 38th Session, Kigali (Rwanda), 17-21 November 2019
 37th Session, Bucharest (Romania), 18-20 March 2019
 36th Session, Cotonou (Benin), 3-5 December 2018
 35th Session, Brussels (Belgium), 18-20 June 2018
 34th Session, Port-au-Prince (Haiti), 18-20 December 2017
 33rd Session, St. Julian’s (Malta), 19-21 June 2017
 32nd Session, Nairobi (Kenya), 19-21 December 2016
 31st Session, Windhoek (Namibia), 13-15 June 2016
 30th Session, Brussels (Belgium), 7-9 December 2015
 29th Session, Suva (Fiji), 15-17 June 2015
 28th Session, Strasbourg (France), 1-3 December 2014
 27th Session, Strasbourg (France). 17-19 March 2014
 26th Session, Addis Ababa (Ethiopia), 23-27 November 2013
 25th Session, Brussels (Belgium), 15-19 June 2013
 24th Session, Paramaribo (Suriname), 25-29 November 2012
 23rd Session, Horsens (Denmark), 26-30 May 2012
 22nd Session, Lome (Togo), 19-23 November 2011
 21st Session, Budapest (Hungary), 14-18 May 2011
 20th Session, Kinshasa (Republic of Congo), 30 Nov - 4 Dec 2010
 19th Session, Tenerife (Spain), 27 March - 1 April 2010
 18th Session, Luanda (Angola), 30 November - 3 December 2009
 17th Session, Prague (Czech Republic), 4-9 April 2009
 16th Session, Port Moresby (Papua New Guinea, 24-28 November 2008
 15th Session, Ljubljana (Slovenia), 15-20 March 2008
 14th Session, Kigali (Rwanda), 17-22 November 2007
 13th Session, Wiesbaden (Germany), 23-28 June 2007
 12th Session, Bridgetown (Barbados), 18-23 November 2006
 11th Session, Vienna (Austria), 17-22 June 2006
 10th Session, Edinburgh (United Kingdom), 19-24 November 2005
 9th Session, Bamako (Mali), 16-20 April 2005
 8th Session, The Hague (The Netherlands), 20-25 November 2004
 7th Session, Addis Ababa (Ethiopia), 16-19 February 2004
 6th Session, Rome, 11-15 October 2003
 5th Session, Brazzaville, 31 March-3 April 2003
 5th Session, Brussels, 25-28 November 2002 (CANCELLED)
 4th Session, Cape Town, 18-21 March 2002
 3rd Session, Brussels, 29 October-1 November 2001 (OJ C 78, 2/4/2002)
 2nd Session, Libreville, 19-22 March 2001 (OJ C 265, 20/9/2001)
 1st Session, Brussels, 9-12 October 2000 (OJ C 64, 28/2/2001)

See also
European Development Fund
ACP-EU Development Cooperation
Foreign relations of the European Union
The Courier (ACP-EU) : The magazine of Africa-Caribbean-Pacific and European Union cooperation and relations
Euronest Parliamentary Assembly
Euro-Latin American Parliamentary Assembly

References

External links
ACP-EU Joint Parliamentary Assembly website
The secretariat of the African, Caribbean and Pacific Group of States, part of the ACP-EU JPA co-secretariat
The secretariat of the European Parliament, part of the ACP-EU JPA co-secretariat
Website on the EU Country & Regional Programming to ACP countries
 The ACP Local Government Platform
European Parliament meeting with ACP The EPP-DE TV
Deal on Economic Partnership Agreements expected at ACP-EU talks
 EUX TV programmes from the 15th assembly
 Documents relating to the ACP–EU Joint Parliamentary Assembly be consulted at the Historical Archives of the European Union in Florence

Parliamentary assemblies
ACP–European Union relations
International development organizations
Organisation of African, Caribbean and Pacific States